Lindesnes is a local newspaper published in Mandal, Norway. It covers central Vest-Agder. It was established in 1889.

It has a circulation of 6,401, of whom 6,211 are subscribers.

Lindesnes is published by Lindesnes AS, which is owned 100% by Fædrelandsvennen AS, which is in turn by Schibsted.

References
Norwegian Media Registry

External links
Website

Publications established in 1889
Daily newspapers published in Norway
Mass media in Vest-Agder
Mandal, Norway
Norwegian-language newspapers
1889 establishments in Norway